Sitora Dushanbe was a football club based in Dushanbe, Tajikistan between 1990 and 1997.

History
Sitora Dushanbe were founded in 1990, and went on to win the Tajik League twice, in 1993 and 1994. At the end of the 1997 season, Sitora ceased to exist due to financial problems.

Domestic history

Continental history

Honours
Tajik League (2): 1993 and 1994.
Tajik Cup (1): 1993

References

Defunct football clubs in Tajikistan
1990 establishments in the Soviet Union
1997 disestablishments in Tajikistan
Association football clubs established in 1990
Association football clubs disestablished in 1997
Football clubs in Dushanbe